Hapalonoma is a genus of moths in the family Gelechiidae.

Species
 Hapalonoma sublustricella (Walker, 1864)
 Hapalonoma argyracta Meyrick, 1914

References

Gelechiinae